Google's Street View program in Chile began with the filming of streets and roads in January 2012. On September 25, 2012, parts of the country were made available online, including Santiago, Valparaíso, Viña del Mar and Concepción. During 2013 and 2014 many more cities and roads were added. In March 2015 coverage was extended to the country's southernmost region of Magallanes (only accessible by road via Argentina). In December 2015 Chile's southernmost city, Puerto Williams, was added.

, coverage is high, with over seven-tenths of all cities —or over three-quarters of the country's population— having most of its streets photographed.

Timeline of introductions

Coverage

Coverage  in cities, which account for 83% of the country's total population:

See also
Google Street View in Latin America

References

External links
About Street View: Current driving locations and areas presently available.

Geography of Chile
Google Street View
Internet in Chile